The 1955 Chatham Cup was the 28th annual nationwide knockout football competition in New Zealand.

The competition was run on a regional basis, with regional associations each holding separate qualifying rounds.

Teams taking part in the final rounds are known to have included Eastern Suburbs (Auckland), Huntly Thistle (Waikato), Eastern Union (Gisborne), New Plymouth Old Boys (Taranaki) Napier Rovers (Hawkes Bay), Wanganui Athletic (Whanganui), Kiwi United (Manawatu), Masterton Athletic (Wairarapa) Victoria University (Wellington), Western (Christchurch), and Roslyn-Wakari (Dunedin).

The 1955 final
In the final, winger Peter Saunderson became the seventh player to score a finals hat-trick. Western's total of six goals equalled Waterside's tally from the 1940 final, and the aggregate of eight goals also equalled the record set in that final. The game was played in a howling Wellington southerly, and Western made full use of it in the first half, rattling in four goals. John White and Alex Davis had both scored in the opening dozen minutes, and these were added to by both Saunderson and Stan Ralph. In the second half Anderson and King reduced the deficit to two before Saunderson scored a further brace to seal the win for the southerners. King's goal was his sixth in Chatham Cup finals, after a hat-trick in the 1951 Final and two more in 1953.

Results

Final

References

Rec.Sport.Soccer Statistics Foundation New Zealand 1955 page

Chatham Cup
Chatham Cup
Chatham Cup
September 1955 sports events in New Zealand